Alternanthera galapagensis is a species of plant in the family Amaranthaceae. It is endemic to the Galapagos.

References

Flora of Ecuador
galapagensis
Vulnerable plants
Taxonomy articles created by Polbot
Plants described in 1911